Chi Rho is the monogram ☧ representing "Christ".

Chi Rho also may refer to:
 ☧-bearing military banner labarum of fourth-century and later Roman emperors
 Chi Rho, chorus at Wake Forest University

See also 
 Cairo, the capital of Egypt
 Chiro (disambiguation)